Stokenham ([stəʊ̯kən'hæm], not ['stəʊ̯kənəm], being a break with other comparators in England) is a village and civil parish in the English county of Devon. The population of the parish at the 2011 census was 1,895.

Places in the parish
As well as Stokenham the civil parish includes the settlements of Torcross, Beesands, Hallsands, Kellaton, Kernborough, Dunstone, Beeson and Chillington and Bickerton. It forms part of the district of South Hams.

History
The village of Stokenham was known in Saxon Times as Stoc or Stoc Hamme ("meaning Stoc meadows"). By the 13th century the town was called Stoke in Hamme. An electoral ward has the same name. The ward population at the 2011 census was 1,895.

In Mediaeval times St. Humbert the Confessor (d.1188AD) was locally venerated as patron saint in the town.

The area was known in the 19th century for the fine crabs, and in World War II local residents were evacuated from the area, on the eve of D-day.

Geography
To the east of the parish is Start Bay in the English Channel. The principal road in the parish is the A379 running between the nearest towns of Kingsbridge (to the west) and Dartmouth to the north.

Local landmarks

The parish church
The present church dates from 1431; an earlier Norman church predated it.

"The church as it stands today, is a fine example of the perpendicular style of medieval architecture. It is built on the side of a hill so that its whole length can be seen from below and is dedicated to St Michael and All Angels, which was common practice for churches standing on elevated sites. It was, however, dedicated to St Barnabas and prior to that to St Humbert the Confessor."

Stokenham manor house
Immediately to the east of the church is the site of Stokenham manor house, abandoned in 1585 but possibly dating back to at least the 12th century.

Local pub
The Tradesman's Arms is an imposing 14th-century, part-thatched pub and restaurant.

On the 27th of September 2021, a fire believed to have originated in the kitchen destroyed much of the pub alongside three neighbouring homes.

References

 
Villages in South Hams